Kellavere Landscape Conservation Area is a nature park in Lääne-Viru County, Estonia.

The protected area was designated in 1959 to protect Kellavere Hill and its surrounding areas. In 2006, the protected area was redesigned to the landscape conservation area.

References

Nature reserves in Estonia
Geography of Lääne-Viru County